Patrice Lair (born 16 June 1961) is a French football coach. He is currently the manager of Division 1 Féminine side Bordeaux.

Career
As a footballer Lair played in the lower categories in France. After spending a decade in Stade Briochin and US Avranches, in 1987 he moved to FC Périgueux where he had his first experience as a coach, coaching the junior team while playing in the first team. He repeated these functions in US Saint-Malo before making his debut as a player-coach in USA Pouancé in 1993. He subsequently played and coached for Racing Doué, AC Pouzauges, Trélissac FC, ESA Briviste and Reims either as a player-coach or training junior teams, before retiring in 2001.

After retiring he was appointed the assistant coach of Stade de Reims, which was promoted in 2002 to Ligue 2 after a decade in lower categories. After first coach Marc Collat was sacked in 2003 he was offered his position, but he declined the offer and moved to AS Angoulême as an assistant coach. In 2004, he held his first position as a first coach in CS Villeneuve, and in 2005 he made his debut in women's football, taking charge of defending champion Montpellier HSC. Under Lair's two-years tenure Montpellier won two national cups, reached the 2006 European Cup semifinals and was the championship's runner-up behind FCF Juvisy and Olympique Lyonnais. Lair subsequently returned to male amateur football, coaching Castelnau-le-Crès FC for two seasons. In 2009, he moved to Benin to coach Espoir de Savalou, but he left the team after a month. He also coached briefly the Rwanda under-17 national team, also serving as the senior team's assistant coach, the following year.

In June 2010, Lair returned to France to coach Olympique Lyonnais women's team, replacing Farid Benstiti. He was nominated for the FIFA Women's Football World Coach award in 2011 and 2012. After the 2013–14 Division 1 Féminine season, Lair stepped down as the Coach of Olympique Lyonnais women's team, after achieving a third straight domestic double. He stated that it was the perfect way to leave. During his reign at Lyon, Lair led the club to four Division 1 Féminine titles, three Coupe de France Féminine titles and two UEFA Women's Champions League titles.

On 28 May 2018, he was announced as the new head coach of Chamois Niortais. In December 2018 he was suspended, and he was formally sacked in January 2019.

On 4 June 2019, he was announced manager of newly relegated Ligue 2 club Guingamp for the 2019/20 season. After a poor start which saw the club in 14th place with nine points, he was sacked on 23 September 2019.

References

Living people
1961 births
Sportspeople from Saint-Brieuc
French football managers
French footballers
Association football midfielders
Stade Briochin players
US Avranches players
US Saint-Malo players
Trélissac FC players
Stade de Reims players
Olympique Lyonnais Féminin managers
Paris Saint-Germain Féminine managers
En Avant Guingamp managers
Chamois Niortais F.C. managers
Footballers from Brittany